Zero footprint may refer to:
Zero Footprint Applications
Absence of ecological footprint
 Zerofootprint Private  Company